Kethureddipatti is a Village Panchayat in Dharmapuri district of Tamil Nadu, India. It comes under Pappireddipatti taluk and Kadathur Block. It belongs to Pappireddipatti State Legislative Assembly Constituency and Dharmapuri Loksabha Constituency. It consists of nine panchayat wards. As per the 2011 Census, the total population of this village is 4,808.

Geography 
It is in the southern region of the district. It is surrounded by Kavaramalai RF in the southest and Vathalmalai Hills in the northwest.

Demographics 
As per the 2011 census of India, the Kethureddipatti Village has population of 4,808 out of which male population is 2,456 while female population is 2,352. Literacy rate of kettureddipatty village is 64.43% out of which 73.62% males and 54.85% females are literate.

Transport 
Kethureddipatti has both government and private bus connectivity with Bommidi, Kadathur, Pappireddipatti, Harur, Dharmapuri.

Road 
From thereon buses to Chennai, Kovai, Salem, Harur, Dharmapuri etc. operated on timely and daily basis by both Tamil Nadu State Transport Corporation (TNSTC) and private transports.

Trains 
There are three nearby railway stations available, Bommidi, Morappur and Buddireddipatti.  Both Bommidi and Morappur has train connectivity with Chennai, Salem, Coimbatore, Tirupati, Kerala etc. through express and superpast express trains. Buddireddipatti has passenger train connectivity only.

Airport 
Nearest airport: Salem Airport, is 47 km from Kethureddipatti, Coimbatore Airport to Kethureddipatti 218 km, Bengalore Airport to Kethureddipatti 190 Km, Chennai Airport to Kethureddipatti 282 km.

Political and Revenue administration 
The Kethureddipatti Village Panchayat has

 One Village Panchayat President
 One ward Councillor
 9 ward representatives.

Habitations: 

 Anna Nagar
 Dharmalingam Kottai
 Kali Kottai
 Kanapathi Kottai
 Kethureddipatti
 Muttaikkannan Kottai
 Savulukkottai
 Sengan Nagar
 Sinnoor
 Pudhukuttaiyan Kottai
 Perisu Kottai
 Veppilaipatti

Public utilities

Education 
Kethureddipatti panchyat consists of one

 Government High School, Kethureddipatti
 Government Middle School, Veppilaipatti
 Government Primary School, Kethureddipatti.Nearby Schools are

 Government Higher Secondary School, Buddireddipatti
 Government Higher Secondary School, Nathamedu
 Government Higher Secondary School, Kadathur
 Government Higher Secondary School, Bommidi
 Annai India Matric Higher Secondary School, Bommidi
 AMG Matric Higher Secondary School, Bommidi
 Sri Vinayaga Vidhyalaya Matric Higher Secondary School, Sillarahalli
 Achievers  Academy, Sungarahalli,
 Greenpark CBSE School, Kadathur
 Kalaimagal Matric Higher Secondary School, Kadathur
 Swamy Vivekanandha Matric Higher Secondary School, Kadathur.

Nearby Colleges

 Government Polytechnic College, Kadathur
 Government Arts College, Pappireddipatti
 Government Arts & Science College, Dharmapuri
 Government Engineering College, Settikarai, Dharmapuri
 Government Medical College & Hospital, Dharmapuri

Government hospitals 
Nearby government hospitals are

 Primary Health Center, Kadathur
 Primary Health Center, Bommidi
 Primary Health Center, Ramiyenahalli

Banks 
Nearby banks are

 Cooperative Bank, Talanatham
 Indian Bank, Sillarahalli,
 Indian Bank, Kadathur,
 Indian Bank, Bommidi,
 State Bank of India, Kadathur,
 Canera Bank, Bommidi
 Tamilnadu Mercantile Bank, Bommidi.

Government offices 
It has a Village Administrative Office at Kethureddipatti which maintains the records of revenue, patta/chitta details of the Kethureddipatti Revenue Village

Registrar Office 
Nearby sub-registrer office is located at Kadathur.

Post office 
Kethureddipatti has one Sub-Post office which has a branch office at Buddireddipatti.

Common Service Center (CSC) 
It has two common service centers (CSC) at kethureddipatti. Nearby CSC Center is located at Talanatham.

Police service 
Kethureddipatti comes under the Kadathur C-3 Police Station Circle. The another nearby Police Station is C-6 Police Station, Nadur, Bommidi.

See also 

 Kethureddipatti
Kadathur
 Kadathur block
 Bommidi
 Pappireddipatti
 Dharmapuri
 Dharmapuri District
 கேத்துரெட்டிபட்டி
 கேத்துரெட்டிபட்டி ஊராட்சி

References 

Villages in Dharmapuri district